Abdallah Bou Habib is a Lebanese economist, author, and diplomat who since 2021 serves as Minister of Foreign Affairs in the government of Prime Minister Najib Mikati.

Abdallah Rashid Bouhabib, born November 21, 1941, is a Lebanese economist, author, and diplomat who since September 10, 2021, is serving as the 50th Minister of Foreign Affairs and Emigrants of Lebanon, a cabinet position heading the department of government that executes the country's foreign policy and maintains relations with its extensive diaspora communities.  He previously served as Adviser to the Deputy Prime Minister of Lebanon (2001-2005) and as Lebanon's Ambassador to the United States (1983-1990). From 2007-2015 Bouhabib founded and directed the Issam Fares Center for Lebanon, a non-partisan Beirut based think-tank dedicated to the advancement of a balanced and realistic understanding of major global, regional and domestic issues affecting Lebanon.

Bouhabib was born in Jdeide, el Matn, Lebanon.  He is a graduate of Brummana High School (1960) and the American University of Beirut where he received his B.A. in Economics (1967) and his M.A. in Economics (ABT 1970). He received his Ph.D. in Economics from Vanderbilt University in Nashville, Tennessee in 1975. At Vanderbilt University Department of Economics he taught as Assistant Professor (1975-76) and as Senior Teaching Fellow (1973-75). He served as Lecturer at Notre Dame University, Lebanon (2002-2003) and at La Sagesse University, Lebanon (2003-2015)

In 1976, Bouhabib joined the World Bank Group where he served as an Economist and later as Senior Loan Officer until 1983. After serving as Ambassador of Lebanon, he rejoined the World Bank in 1992 and served as Senior Adviser to the Vice President of the MENA Region & Regional External Affairs Unit Chief, MENA Region until retirement in 2001.

Bouhabib has written two books: America's Values and Interest/ A Half Century of US Foreign Policy in the Middle East, 2019 (Arabic) and Al Daou' Al Assar, US policy Towards Lebanon, a record of Bouhabib's seven years as Lebanon's Ambassador to the US, 1991 (Arabic). Over the past thirty years, he has published a myriad of articles about Lebanon in regional and international dailies. His Ph.D. dissertation: The Long-Run Supply of Crude Oil in the United States (Vanderbilt University, 1975) was published by Arno Press, NY, 1979.

Bouhabib is married to Julia Seabrook Cole and together they have three children and six grandchildren.

References

Living people
Foreign ministers of Lebanon
Free Patriotic Movement politicians
Lebanese Maronites
American University of Beirut alumni
Vanderbilt University alumni
Place of birth missing (living people)
1941 births